Faunus is an unincorporated community in Menominee County, in the U.S. state of Michigan.

History
A post office was established at Faunus in 1896, and discontinued in 1908. The community was named after Faunus, a god in Roman mythology.

References

Unincorporated communities in Menominee County, Michigan